The Heartland Light Rail System was a proposed light rail system for Kansas City, Missouri. It was defeated by voters in November 2008, there are some planning in the Kansas City Smart Moves Plan.

Proposed route
The line would have run on a north and south route from Vivion Road and North Oak Trafficway to Bruce R. Watkins Roadway and 63rd Street . This route would have crossed into Jackson County, Clay County, and over the Missouri River.

See also
KC Streetcar

References

External links
Kansas City Light Rail Page
Kansas City Light Rail
Kansas City Light Rail Blog
North/South Corridor Analysis
North/South Assessment

Kansas City Area Transportation Authority
Light rail in Missouri
Proposed railway lines in Missouri
Public transportation in Kansas City, Missouri